= Tanzwoche =

Theatre festival in Germany

Tanzwoche is a theatre festival in Germany.
